Trichomycterus chiltoni is a species of pencil catfish endemic to Chile.

References
 

chiltoni
Fish of South America
Freshwater fish of Chile
Taxa named by Carl H. Eigenmann
Taxonomy articles created by Polbot
Fish described in 1928
Endemic fauna of Chile